Alive/Physical Thing is Japanese singer-songwriter Koda Kumi's forty-fifth single and was released on September 16, 2009. It debuted at No. 1 on Oricon, making it her eighth number-one single, and charted for seven weeks.

Information
Alive/Physical Thing is Japanese singer-songwriter Koda Kumi's forty-fifth single. It was released on September 16, 2009, and debuted at No. 1 on the Oricon Singles Charts, making it her eighth single to do so, and remained on the charts for seven consecutive weeks.

The single was released as a standard CD and as a CD+DVD combo. Both songs garnered their own music videos, though only the video for "Physical Thing" was placed on the corresponding album, Universe.

Contrasting each other, "Alive" was a slow ballad, while "Physical Thing" was a fast dance-pop track. "Physical Thing" was a cover of the song of the same name by British pop singer, Nosheen. Nosheen's version had been released a year prior on April 16, 2008.

The instrumental to "Alive" was based on that of famous 1700s German baroque composer George Frederic Handel's aria "Lascia ch'io pianga." "Lascia ch'io pianga" was from his most well-known opera Rinaldo. The original melody for the aria was found in Act III of Handel's 1705 opera Almira as a Sarabande.

Promotional Advertisements
"Alive" was used as the theme song for the film adaptation of Kamui the Ninja: Kamui Gaiden.

"Physical Thing'" was used in a commercial for music.jp.

Music video
Both songs received music videos on the CD+DVD edition of the single; however, only the music video of "Physical Thing" made it to the corresponding album, Best ~third universe~ & 8th Al "UNIVERSE".

"Alive" carried a simple visual of an aurora in the sky above a deserted wasteland, symbolizing rebirth. Along with the aurora, Kumi was also seen in a forest against a backdrop of the sunrise. The overall theme was how sadness could bring about rebirth, whereas the song was about moving on after losing a loved one.

"Physical Thing" held a party theme, showing Kumi smoking and drinking red wine. These were themes Kumi had not previously performed and was the last music video showing her smoking until her 2012 music video "Boom Boom Boys" from Japonesque. The visuals for "Physical Thing" were heavily influenced by American pop singer-songwriter Lady Gaga's music video for her 2008 song "Just Dance."

Live Performances
2009.09.12: Music Station – Alive

Track listing

Charts

Oricon Sales Chart (Japan)

Billboard Japan Sales chart

Alternate Versions
Alive
Alive: Found on the single (2009) and corresponding album Universe (2010)
Alive [Instrumental]: Found on the single (2009)

Physical Thing
Physical Thing: Found on the single (2009) and corresponding album Universe (2010)
Physical Thing [Instrumental]: Found on the single (2009)
Physical Thing [FUTURE HOUSE UNITED Remix]: Found on Koda Kumi Driving Hit's 3 (2011)

References

External links 
 Koda Kumi Official Website
 Alive/Physical Thing Information
 Product Information

2009 singles
2009 songs
Japanese film songs
Koda Kumi songs
Oricon Weekly number-one singles
Rhythm Zone singles
Songs written by Koda Kumi